Tingena laudata is a species of moth in the family Oecophoridae. It is endemic to New Zealand and has been observed in Fiordland and Otago. Adults of this species are on the wing in January.

Taxonomy
This species was first described by Alfred Philpott using specimens collected by Charles Edwin Clarke at Bluecliff in Fiordland and Waitati in January and named Borkhausenia laudata. In 1939 George Hudson discussed and illustrated this species under the name B. laudata. In 1988 J. S. Dugdale placed this species in the genus Tingena. The male holotype specimen, collected at Bluecliff, is held at the Auckland War Memorial Museum.

Description 

Philpott described this species as follows:

This species is similar in appearance to T. amiculata but is smaller in size and has longer antennal ciliations. The markings and colouration of the forewings is also different.

Distribution
This species is endemic to New Zealand and has been observed in Fiordland and Otago.

Behaviour
Adults of this species are on the wing in January.

References

Oecophoridae
Moths of New Zealand
Moths described in 1930
Endemic fauna of New Zealand
Taxa named by Alfred Philpott
Endemic moths of New Zealand